Doon Mackichan (born 1962) is a British actress, comedian and writer. She co-created, wrote and performed in the double-Emmy-award-winning Smack the Pony.  She frequently collaborates with Armando Iannucci and Steve Coogan, having played multiple characters in The Day Today, Brass Eye and Alan Partridge, and has also appeared in Toast of London and Two Doors Down.  Mackichan was nominated for Best Female Comedy Performance at the 2014 British Academy Television Awards for her performance in Plebs and won critical praise for her performance alongside John Malkovich in Bitter Wheat in 2019.

Early life
Mackichan was born in London and brought up in a small town near Fife. She studied drama at Manchester University.

Career
Mackichan made her television debut in comedy series Five Alive, shown by Channel 4 between 1987 and 1988, along with Brian Conley (also making his television debut), Peter Piper, Joanna Brookes and Andrew Secombe. In series 2, shown in 1988, Joanna Brookes was replaced by Phil Nice.

Mackichan was one of the writers and stars of the Channel 4 comedy series Smack the Pony and has appeared in a number of Chris Morris radio and television comedy series such as On the Hour, The Day Today and Brass Eye. Mackichan's own BBC Radio show, Doon Your Way, was broadcast in 1996. She also appeared in the sitcoms Beast and Bedtime, and was a regular performer in Knowing Me, Knowing You... with Alan Partridge and The Mary Whitehouse Experience. She appeared in several of The Comic Strip Presents... films in the early 1990s, and appeared in the 1995 comedy The Glam Metal Detectives. In 2009, she appeared as Jane Thomason, the news producer for the BBC in Taking the Flak. She portrayed Cherie Blair in the Channel 4 satirical drama A Very Social Secretary, and appeared in the Channel 4 sitcom Nathan Barley. She portrayed a BBC news presenter, Louise Marlowe, in series 4 of The Sarah Jane Adventures in 2010.

In film, Mackichan played Victoria Lender in 1997's The Borrowers and teamed up with her former Smack the Pony co-stars for the 2004 film Gladiatress. Also in 1998 she appeared in the BBC TV mini-series of Dickens' novel Our Mutual Friend as Sophronia Lammle.

On stage, she appeared with Matt Di Angelo and David Haig in the Joe Orton black farce Loot. In July 2011, Mackichan performed alongside Julian Barratt in Nikolai Gogol's comedy The Government Inspector at the Young Vic Theatre, London. Later in 2011, she played the part of Frances in April de Angelis' play Jumpy at the Royal Court Theatre. Since 2013, Mackichan has starred in Toast of London as Steven Toast's (Matt Berry) quirky agent Jane Plough.

She has narrated several TV series including The Honey Trap and Bank of Mum and Dad. She has also voiced characters in several animated series including Bob and Margaret, Stressed Eric, Don't Eat the Neighbours and Bromwell High.

She fronted a TV ad campaign for Hallmark in the UK, and appeared alongside Darren Boyd as one half of a married couple for a series of Direct Line insurance TV ads in 2012.

She was a contestant in the 2003 BBC charity singing contest Comic Relief does Fame Academy, in which she came fourth.

She has appeared twice on the BBC panel show QI, in series C, episode 2, ("Cummingtonite", 2005) and series E episode 11, ("Endings", 2007).

From 2013 until 2018, Mackichan played Flavia, a recurring character, in the ITV comedy Plebs, for which she was nominated for the British Academy Television Award for Best Female Comedy Performance in 2014. She has played Cathy in the BBC comedy Two Doors Down since 2013.

In 2017 she played Feste in the Royal National Theatre's production of Twelfth Night and television film Death on the Tyne in 2018. Mackichan appeared as the Archangel Michael in the Amazon Prime/BBC mini-series Good Omens and as Sarah in Channel 4 comedy-drama Pure in 2019.

In 2019 she appeared as Sondra in David Mamet's Bitter Wheat at the Garrick Theatre. Writing in The Guardian, Michael Billington praised her as having given the show's best performance.

Personal life
In 1997, Mackichan married the actor Anthony Barclay. In 1998, she swam the English Channel as part of a six-person relay team.

Mackichan and Barclay were divorced in 2005, after having three children together. She then lived with her children in Clapham, South London. In 2016, she was living in Hastings, East Sussex.

In March 2016, Mackichan was part of a team of well-known people who attempted to sail around a section of Britain in just five days, as part of the BT Sport Relief Challenge: Hell on High Seas.

Filmography

Film

Television

Theatre

Awards and nominations

References

External links
 
 

1962 births
Living people
20th-century English actresses
21st-century English actresses
Alumni of the University of Manchester
British women screenwriters
English Channel swimmers
English film actresses
English screenwriters
English stage actresses
English television actresses
English voice actresses
English women comedians
People from Surrey
People from Upper Largo